Maricela Montemayor (born 4 December 1991) is a Mexican sprint canoeist.

She won a medal at the 2019 ICF Canoe Sprint World Championships.

References

External links

1991 births
Living people
ICF Canoe Sprint World Championships medalists in kayak
Mexican female canoeists
Sportspeople from Monterrey
Pan American Games medalists in canoeing
Pan American Games silver medalists for Mexico
Pan American Games bronze medalists for Mexico
Canoeists at the 2011 Pan American Games
Canoeists at the 2015 Pan American Games
Canoeists at the 2019 Pan American Games
Medalists at the 2011 Pan American Games
Medalists at the 2015 Pan American Games
Medalists at the 2019 Pan American Games
20th-century Mexican women
21st-century Mexican women